Aníbal Pachano (born March 7, 1955) is an Argentine choreographer, actor, dancer, director and architect. Together with his ex-wife Ana Sans, he created the renowned art group "Botton tap." His show  "Small" is currently on Billboard

Biography 

In 1966, his father, a dentist and politician-turned-blind, tried to break into the culinary field, but without success. His family went bankrupt, and had to travel to Buenos Aires, where Anibal started working as an errand boy. This didn't last, however, since moved to a different city every year.
When he was 17, he was about to win a dance contest in the program,"Alta Tensión" (High Voltage) but was eliminated causing him a great frustration. Then, he studied architecture. During his time as a student he worked with Antonio Jantus (between 1974 and 1976).Later on he was a foreman in the Kliczkowski-Minond-Natanson-Nevani-Sztulwark studio, where he worked with Eduardo Rojkind, until he received his degree in architecture from the University of Buenos Aires in 1980. After this, he worked as a Professor of Visual Communication Systems III at the UBA, arriving in 1982 to design a house in the resort of Cariló.
At 28, he fell in love with Ana Sans, a dancer he met when he went to see a musical. He began studying jazz dance at the same studio that she attended and two weeks later went to live together. Ana Sans and Aníbal created art group "Botton tap". Later on they had a daughter, Sofia. .
In May 2010 he revealed that he had been living with HIV since 2000.

Career 
While his career began in 1982, was in 2009 in Showmatch, the program hosted by Marcelo Tinelli, where he gained more popularity. He can be easily recognized by the way he dresses, due to the fact he frequently uses very colorful ties and top hats. In 2009 he created the play Pour La Gallery. He regularly appears as a guest panelist on Bendita TV driving a cycle with Beto Casella. In 2010, he again participated at the panel of judges of Showmatch Bailando 2010 and toured with his play Pour La Gallery. On November 27, 2010, Aníbal Pachano finished the country wide tour of his play Pour The Gallery in Córdoba. He began his 2011 tour of the play in Mar del Plata
Additionally on 2011 he took part on the parade of "Mar del Plata Fashion Show."

In 2014 he was of the dancers in Soñando por Bailar, in El trece held by Marcelo Tinelli

Bottom Tap
With dancer Ana Sans, Aníbal created the artistic group "Botton tap." The story of Bottom Tap began with a show that premiered in Mar del Plata. Poppy was the first show they presented. Then came Tonight, Too much, Bottom Tap 1, Tap Botton 2 and 10 years of Botton. The artistic godmother of the "Bottom Tap" is Mirtha Legrand.

Theatre

TV

Premios Estrella de Mar

Notes

References
 http://www.perfil.com/contenidos/2010/05/08/noticia_0021.html (in Spanish)
 https://web.archive.org/web/20101119033932/http://www.losandes.com.ar/notas/2009/9/16/estilo-446283.asp  (in Spanish)
 https://web.archive.org/web/20101119033748/http://www.losandes.com.ar/notas/2009/9/16/estilo-446284.asp  (in Spanish)

External links

1955 births
Living people
People from Nueve de Julio Department, Santa Fe
Argentine choreographers
Argentine architects
Argentine LGBT actors
Bailando por un Sueño (Argentine TV series) BAR members
LGBT choreographers
People with HIV/AIDS
21st-century LGBT people
Participants in Argentine reality television series
Bailando por un Sueño (Argentine TV series) participants
Bailando por un Sueño (Argentine TV series) judges